Gilles Privat N'Guessan (born 5 March 1992) is an Ivorian professional footballer who plays for Arta/Solar7 in the Djibouti Premier League as a defender.

Club career

Stade d'Abidjan
In July 2014, N'Guessan joined Stade d'Abidjan of the Ivorian Ligue 1. He wore the number 8 during the 2014–15 season.

Africa Sports
In 2016, he joined Africa Sports. On 26 November 2016, he scored the lone goal in a 1–0 victory over AS Denguélé. In 2017, he won the Coupe de Côte d'Ivoire.

Jeddah Club
In 2018, N'Guessan joined Jeddah Club of the Saudi Arabian Prince Mohammad bin Salman League, the second tier of football in the country.

SC Gagnoa
In January 2019, N'Guessan returned to the Ivory Coast, joining Ligue 1 side SC Gagnoa on a free transfer.

FC San Pédro
In summer 2019, he joined FC San Pédro, where he won the 2019 Coupe de Côte d'Ivoire for a second time.

ASEC Mimosas
In 2021, N'Guessan joined reigning champions ASEC Mimosas, wearing the number 2. On 16 December 2021, he won player of the match in a 3–0 victory over Stella Club d'Adjamé.

Arta/Solar7
On 8 August 2022, N'Guessan joined Arta/Solar7 of the Djibouti Premier League. He made his debut in a 2–1 defeat to Al-Merrikh SC in the CAF Champions League, scoring an own goal in the 88th minute.

Honours

Club
Africa Sports
 Coupe de Côte d'Ivoire: 2017

Arta/Solar7
 Djibouti Super Cup: 2022

ASEC Mimosas
 Ligue 1: 2021–2022

FC San Pédro
 Coupe de Côte d'Ivoire: 2019

References

External links
 

1992 births
Living people
Association football defenders
Ivorian footballers
Ivory Coast international footballers
Jeddah Club players
SC Gagnoa players
FC San-Pédro players
ASEC Mimosas players
AS Arta/Solar7 players
Djibouti Premier League players
Saudi First Division League players
Ivorian expatriate footballers
Ivorian expatriate sportspeople in Djibouti
Expatriate footballers in Djibouti
Ivorian expatriate sportspeople in Saudi Arabia
Expatriate footballers in Saudi Arabia